Yin Depei (born 2 May 1991) is a Chinese footballer currently playing as a goalkeeper for Qingdao Youth Island.

Career statistics

Club

References

1991 births
Living people
Chinese footballers
Association football goalkeepers
China League Two players
Shandong Tengding F.C. players
Shaanxi Chang'an Athletic F.C. players